The Nikon D5100 is a 16.2-megapixel DX-format DSLR F-mount camera announced by Nikon on April 5, 2011. It features the same 16.2-megapixel CMOS sensor as the D7000 with 14-bit depth, while delivering Full HD 1080p video mode at either 24, 25 or 30fps. The D5100 is the first Nikon DSLR to offer 1080p video at a choice of frame rates; previous Nikon DSLRs that recorded 1080p only did so at 24 fps. It replaced the D5000 and was replaced by the D5200.

Feature list 
 Sony IMX071 16.2-megapixel Nikon DX format CMOS sensor.
 Nikon EXPEED 2 image/video processor.
 Automatic correction of lateral chromatic aberration for JPEGs. Correction-data is additionally stored in RAW-files and used by Nikon Capture NX, View NX and some other RAW tools.
 D-Movie mode with autofocus. (Up to 1080p at 24, 25 or 30, 720p at 25 or 30 frames per second.)
 Inbuilt time-lapse photography intervalometer
 Active D-Lighting.
 First Nikon DSLR with in camera High Dynamic Range mode (Built-in Camera HDR).
  articulated 921,000-dot LCD.
 Live View shooting mode with Contrast Detect and face priority auto focus (activated with a dedicated button).
 Continuous Drive up to 4 frames per second.
 3D Color Matrix Metering II with Scene Recognition System.
 3D Tracking Multi-CAM 1000 autofocus sensor module with 11 AF points (One cross-type sensor in centre of frame).
 ISO sensitivity 100 to 6400 and up to 25600 with boost. With monochrome Night-vision up to ISO 102400 equivalent.
 Bracketing (exposure, Active D-Lighting and white-balance).
 Auto scene recognition mode with 19 pre-programmed scenes.
 Quiet shooting mode.
 Built-in sensor cleaning system (vibrating low-pass filter) and airflow control system.
 HDMI HD video output.
 Stereo microphone input (mono using built-in mic)
 Enhanced built-in RAW processing with extended Retouch menu for image processing without using a computer: D-Lighting, Red-eye reduction, Trimming, Monochrome & filter effects, Color balance, Image overlay, NEF (RAW) processing, Quick retouch, Straighten, Distortion control, Fisheye, Color outline, Color sketch, Perspective control, Miniature effect, Selective Color, Edit movie, Side-by-side comparison.
 File formats: JPEG, NEF (Nikon's RAW, 14-bit), H.264 video codec.
 EN-EL14 Lithium-ion Battery with up to 660 shots per charge (CIPA).

The D5100 has no in-body autofocus motor, and fully automatic autofocus requires one of the currently 162 lenses with an integrated autofocus motor. With any other lenses the camera's electronic rangefinder (which indicates if the subject inside the selected focus point is in focus or not) can be used to manually adjust focus.

It can mount unmodified A-lenses (also called Non-AI, Pre-AI or F-type) with support of the electronic rangefinder and without metering.

Optional accessories
The Nikon D5100 has available accessories such as:
 Nikon Stereo Microphone ME-1 
 Nikon ML-L3 Wireless (Infrared) and MC-DC2 wired remotes. Third party remotes are also available.
 Nikon GP-1 GPS Unit for direct GPS geotagging. Third party solutions partly with 3-axis compass, data-logger, bluetooth and support for indoor use are available from Solmeta, Dawn, Easytag, Foolography, Gisteq and Phottix. See comparisons/reviews.
 Battery grip third party solutions are available.
 Nikon CF-DC2 Soft Case.
 Third party solutions for WLAN transmitter are available.
 Various Nikon Speedlight or third party flash units including devices with Nikon Creative Lighting System wireless flash commander or support for SU-800 Wireless Speedlight Commander.
 Third party radio (wireless) flash control triggers are partly supporting i-TTL, but do not support the Nikon Creative Lighting System (CLS). See reviews.
 Tethered shooting with Nikon Camera Control Pro 2, Apple Aperture 3, Adobe Lightroom 3.0 and above  or other partly free products including apps.
 Other accessories from Nikon and third parties, including protective cases and bags, eyepiece adapters and correction lenses, and underwater housings.

Reception
Independent reviews and image comparisons at all ISO speeds in JPEG and RAW (with different lenses) are available.

DxO Labs awarded its sensor an overall score of 80.

Filming
Nikon France used the D5100 for the production of the short film "Fragments".
Nikon used the D5100 to film one of the television commercials for the camera itself, which feature actor and perennial Nikon pitchman Ashton Kutcher.

See also
List of Nikon F-mount lenses with integrated autofocus motors

References

External links 

 Digitutor Nikon D5100 Nikon (needs Flash)
 Nikon D5100 Product Page at Nikon Global
 Nikon D5100 Manual Nikon

D5100
D5100
Live-preview digital cameras
Cameras introduced in 2011
Cameras made in Thailand